Bronxville is a village in Westchester County, New York

Bronxville may also refer to:
 Bronxville Public Library, the public library of Bronxville
 Bronxville Reformed Church, a parish church of the Reformed Church in America in Bronxville
 Bronxville station, a commuter rail stop in Bronxville
 Bronxville Union Free School District, the public school district of Bronxville
 Bronxville Women's Club, a women's club in Bronxville